Tuek Thla is a khum (commune) of Serei Saophoan District in Banteay Meanchey Province in north-western Cambodia.

Villages

 Ba Nay(បាណយ)
 Dei Lou(ដីឡូ)
 Keab(កៀប)
 Phnum Bak(ភ្នំបាក់)
 Tuek Thla(ទឹកថ្លា)
 Tumnob Chrey(ទំនប់ជ្រៃ)

References

Communes of Banteay Meanchey province
Serei Saophoan District